An Italian passport is issued upon request to an Italian citizen for the purpose of international travel. It is valid for 10, 5 or 3 years, depending on the applicant's age. Its biometric version has been available since 2006.

Every Italian citizen is also a citizen of the European Union. The passport, along with the national identity card, allows for free movement and residence in any EU member state, in the European Economic Area and in Switzerland.

Physical appearance
Italian passports share the common design of EU Passports: they are burgundy-coloured, with the Emblem of Italy emblazoned in the center of the front cover. The word "Passaporto", meaning passport, is inscribed below the coat of arms and "Unione Europea", "Repubblica Italiana" above. The biometry symbol appears right below "Passaporto" in the centre.
The current version of the passport contains 48 pages.

Identity information page
The biodata are on page 2 of the passport, and include the following:

 Photo of Passport Holder 
 Type 
 Code of Issuing State (ITA)
 Passport No.
 Surname (1)
 Given Names (2)
 Nationality (3)
 Date of Birth (4)
 Sex (5)
 Place of Birth (6)
 Date of Issue (7)
 Date of Expiration (8)
 Authority (9)
 Holder's signature (10)

The information page ends with the Machine Readable Zone.

Languages
The data page is printed in Italian, English and French.
Further translation is provided on page 6, in all 23 official languages of the European Union.

Visa free travel

Visa requirements for Italian citizens are administrative entry restrictions by the authorities of other states placed on citizens of Italy. As of 21 September 2022, Italian citizens had visa-free or visa on arrival access to 189 countries and territories, ranking the Italian passport 4th in terms of travel freedom (tied with Luxembourg and Finland) according to the Henley Passport Index.

Issuing
The Italian passport is issued by the Minister of Foreign Affairs, through
 Questure (State Police provincial offices) in Italy
 Italian consulates and embassies abroad
However, Italian citizens can also apply through Carabinieri (Stazioni dei Carabinieri) and Police (Commissariati) offices. Since the introduction of biometric passports in 2006, applicants should appear in person at the Police offices to have fingerprints collected; children under 12 are exempt, but should appear in person nonetheless.

The current fee for a standard 10-year biometric passport is €116. The requirement to attach an annual revenue stamp inside the passport was canceled in 2014.

Multiple passports 
Italians are allowed to have two passports if they have a valid reason, such as having a stamp from a country like Israel, which may cause trouble with other countries (some countries do not accept passports that contain stamps issued by Israeli authorities).

One passport will have to be stored in a Questura (provincial headquarters of the State Police) or consulate.

Gallery of historic images

See also

Italian nationality law
Italian electronic identity card
Visa requirements for Italian citizens
Visa policy of the Schengen Area

References

External links

Italian Police official site
Passport process site
Benefits of an Italian passport for Italian dual citizens

Italy
Passport
Passport
European Union passports